James Bendon (born 1937) is a stamp dealer, publisher, and philatelist who is an authority on specimen stamps. He wrote and published the first worldwide catalogue of Universal Postal Union specimen stamps and subsequently published philatelic books by authors such as Robson Lowe and James Negus.

Early life and family
James Bendon was born in 1937. In 1980, he married Robyn L. Shenker in the Chelsea district of London.

Career
Bendon traded as a stamp dealer, first in the United Kingdom and later in Cyprus from where his first book on specimen stamps, UPU Specimen Stamps, was self-published in 1988. The book was the first worldwide account of the method of distribution of specimen stamps among the members of the Universal Postal Union, earlier works having concentrated on the stamps of Britain or British Commonwealth countries. In 2015, an updated edition was published with colour illustrations and expanded content including a reprint in an appendix of the pioneering article "The Distribution of SPECIMEN Stamps by the U.P.U." by Marcus Samuel that originally appeared in Stamp Collecting in 1964/65.

Encouraged by the success of his book on specimen stamps, from 1991 Bendon began to publish philatelic works by others, starting with James Negus's Philatelic Literature: Compilation Techniques and Reference Sources in 1991 which was followed the same year by a reprinting with a new introduction by Kenneth F. Chapman of the Harris index to philatelic literature edited by James Negus. In all, Bendon published nearly 50 books including a number of reprints of classic works, before he sold his stock of literature to Chris Komondy of Triad Publications.

Bendon became a member of the Royal Philatelic Society London in 1991 and was subsequently elected a fellow of the society.

Own works
UPU Specimen Stamps: The Distribution of Specimen Stamps by the International Bureau of the Universal Postal Union. Edited by James Negus. James Bendon, Limassol, Cyprus, 1988. 
UPU Specimen Stamps 1878–1961. Oxford Book Projects, 2015.

Selected works published
(All published by James Bendon in Limassol)
Negus, James. (1991) Philatelic Literature: Compilation Techniques and Reference Sources. 
Negus, James. (Ed.) (1991) The Harris Index to Philatelic Literature 1879–1925: Reprint Edition of The Standard Index to Philatelic Literature 1879–1925 with Additional Material. 
Nishioka, Tatsuiji. 65 Years in Stamps: A Philatelic History of the Showa Period. 
Van den Bold, W.E.J. (1994) Handbook of Thematic Philately. 
Cohn, Ernst M. (1995) Ordinary Mail by Diplomatic Means during the Siege of Paris 1870–1871. 
Lowe, Robson & Carl Walske. (1996) The Oneglia Engraved Forgeries Commonly Attributed to Angelo Panelli. .
Mackay, James A. (1997) Under the Gum: Background to British Stamps 1840–1940.

References

Further reading
Biography in Cyprus Weekly, 25 December 1991, p. 21.

External links 

1937 births
British philatelists
British stamp dealers
Fellows of the Royal Philatelic Society London
Publishers (people) from London
Living people
Collectors from London